Center Market was a market hall in Washington, D.C. designed by architect Adolph Cluss which operated in Washington, DC from 1872 to 1931. The building was demolished in 1931 to be replaced by the National Archives Building. A market called Center Market had been in operation on the same block of land since 1802. In 1931, the name of Center Market was transferred over to the Northern Liberty Market located a few blocks north.

History

Early history
In 1797, President George Washington designated two acres in Washington City to be used as a public marketplace. On October 6, 1802, a City Council Ordinance is approved by Mayor Robert Brent to establish Center Market south of Pennsylvania Avenue NW, between 7th and 9th Streets NW. Section 5 of the Ordinance states "That no person shall sell or expose for sale in said market any unsound, blown, or unwholesome meat or articles of provision, under the penalty of five dollars for every offence."

The first Center Market opened soon after on this land by the Washington City Canal (now Constitution Avenue). It was a hub of commercial activity for the city and it is said that President Thomas Jefferson visited the market. Until the abolition of slavery in the District of Columbia in 1862, slaves were sold at the market. It then became a place of business for African Americans who owned some of the stalls and sold goods.

By 1850, the market was a mixture of frame buildings with no coherence though located in such a prestigious location between the White House and the Capitol.
Despite its popularity and major importance in the local economy, Congress and the public considered the market a health and safety hazard with its 700 vendors in 1870. A new building was needed with better ventilation and drainage.

In 1863, Mayor Richard Wallach had Adolf Cluss and Joseph Wildrich von Kammerhueber design a brick structure on B Street NW (Constitution Avenue). A two-story building was designed and construction started. By June 1864, a unanimous vote from both the members of the House of Representatives District Committee and then the entire House of Representatives stopped the project as Congress had not authorized the building. It was torn down but the walls were already up and showed what a modern market could look like.

A new building 

A new Center Market building was chartered and the company incorporated by an Act of Congress on May 20, 1870 and opened for business on July 1, 1872. It was designed by the same architect (Adolph Cluss) as the demolished building of 1864.

It was operated by the Washington Market Company with as first principal Officers:
 First President: Former 1st Governor of the District of Columbia Henry D. Cooke
 Second President: Former Mayor of Washington, DC Matthew G. Emery 
 Third President: Nehemiah G. Ordway

At the time of its construction, it was the largest market hall in the country (57,500 square feet)—large enough to supply the rapidly growing urban population of D.C. with fresh groceries.

The 9th Street Wing and Arcade were added in 1888 nearly doubling the capacity of the structure. In the process, it also added mechanical refrigeration with 400,000 cubic feet of cold storage rooms for meats using 10 miles of heavy two-inch brine pipes and electric lighting machinery. A very tall chimney stood above the boiler room.

The architect unconventionally designed the market building without alleys or driveways for traffic; by doing so, he hoped to encourage customers to stroll leisurely around the market.

Layout

The building had three wings connected to one another with a total of 666 stalls: 
 the 7th Street Wing which ran parallel to 7th Street NW (stalls 1 to 155)
 the B Street Wing which ran parallel to B Street NW connecting the 7th Street Wing to the 9th Street Wing (stalls 156 to 511)
 the 9th Street Wing which ran parallel to 9th Street NW (stalls 512 to 666)

These three wings formed a U. An additional structure stood separate with 12 wholesale stores and a bank in the area left vacant on the lot.

A Plaque posted in front of the building provided extensive details on the building:
 7th St. Wing: 200 ft x 78 ft
 9th St. Wing: 200 ft x 78 ft
 B St. Wing: 344 ft x 84 ft
 Arcade building (12 wholesale stores): 274 ft x 40 ft
 North Center Wing: 32 ft x 42 ft
 Boiler and Pump House connections: 24 ft x 34 ft
 Iron buildings for brine tanks: 32 ft x 41 ft and electric light machinery 29 ft x 41 ft
 Eight hydraulic elevators for conveying products to and from Cold Storage rooms
 Six artesian wells yielding pure cold water
 Total number of stalls inside Main Market: 666
 Iron booths under awnings: 34
 Spaces for farmer's tables on side walls: 100
 Wagon spaces for actual producers in interior of Market grounds or on curbs: 200
 Total number of spaces when fully occupied by retail dealers: 1000
 Area used for market purposes, exclusive of courts and drives: 2 1/4 acres

All the buildings were two stories high and the 7th Street Wing and the 9th Street Wing were both flanked with two towers and a metal awning over the main entrances. Another metal awning ran the entire length of B Street NW and 9th Street NW. These protected shoppers visiting the outdoors stalls. For a small fee, street dealers could place their stands outside, under the market canopy.

A small park with trees stood between the buildings and Pennsylvania and Louisiana Avenue. From 1880 to 1931, the Rawlins Statue stood in the triangular lot where the two avenues intersect.

Services
Inside the building, customers could buy all their groceries in Center Market. Stalls of meats, fish, vegetables, condiments as well as flowers were available to serve them. Cold rooms provided storage of meats and other perishables and all dealers had storage on site for their produces. Good for sale were put on display on stands tiled with white subway tiles for cleanliness.

Customers could also use the Cold Storage Department to use the fur room where items such as dressed furs, carpets, rugs and other garments could be stored in order to protect them from moths and other insects that could destroy them.

Artesian wells provided fresh pure water for refrigerating purposes as well as the manufacturing of ice. This was extremely important considering houses did not have refrigerators at the time and used ice to preserve food.

Outside the building, other vendors sold similar produces but did not have access to the same storage facilities as inside.

Demolition
The Market was sitting on prime land along what was to become Constitution Avenue. It was incompatible with the McMillan Plan, a comprehensive planning document to redevelop the National Mall by removing the Victorian landscaping and building low Neoclassical museums and taller Federal buildings on the sides.

Center Market closed on January 1, 1931 after over 130 years of activity at the site. Many of the vendors moved to the new Center Market on 5th Street NW and K Street NW. That market was originally known as the Northern Liberty Market and later as Convention Hall Market.

Location

The Center Market occupied an entire block with Pennsylvania Avenue NW on the northern side and Louisiana Ave NW, 7th Street NW on the east, Constitution Avenue on the south and 9th Street NW on the west.

The Center Market was a hub for public transportation, since several of D.C.'s trolley lines converged there:
 The Washington & Georgetown line
 The Metropolitan line
 The Anacostia & Potomac River line

In addition, street parking was available for the few cars of the time.

Today, the National Archives Building stands in its place. Louisiana Ave NW has been renamed Indiana Ave NW east of 7th Street NE and no longer exists on the west. The US Department of Justice Building stands where the avenue used to be.

See also
 Western Market
 Eastern Market

References

External links
 

1872 establishments in Washington, D.C.
1931 disestablishments in Washington, D.C.
Commercial buildings completed in 1872
Demolished buildings and structures in Washington, D.C.
Retail markets in the United States
Food markets in the United States
History of Washington, D.C.
Buildings and structures demolished in 1931
Market halls
Food retailers